The BC-610 was a radio transmitter based on the Hallicrafters HT-4 and was used by the U.S. Army Signal Corps during World War II.

History
In the early 1940s, the U.S. military sought a high-powered radio transmitter capable of infallible voice communications over 100 miles (160 km), sturdy enough to work in all conditions, flexible enough to be able to cover a wide range of frequencies, self-powered and able to operate in motion or at fixed locations. The Hallicrafters HT-4 transmitter was chosen from units available from various U.S. radio manufacturers. The HT-4 was designed for amateur radio use and had been commercially available for several years at a price of approximately $700, rivaling the cost of a car. It was considered compact and stable for its era and could deliver in excess of 300 watts of power for voice or MCW communications and 400 watts during Morse code operation. As was typical in physically large vacuum tube equipment, the manual cautions power output is less at higher frequencies. It was quartz crystal controlled, but could be used over a wide range of frequencies through use of the master-oscillator power amplifier.

Modifications requested by the Signal Corps were performed by Hallicrafters' engineers working with U.S. Army technicians at Fort Monmouth. They made a new version of the HT-4, which was known as the BC-610 transmitter, a part of the SCR-299 mobile communications unit, and production began in 1942. General Dwight Eisenhower credited the SCR-299 in the reorganization of U.S. forces, which led to their victory against the Nazis at Kasserine Pass. The SCR-299 was also used in the Invasion of Sicily and later, Italy.

A BC-610 transmitter was used by double agent Juan Pujol García during WWII as part of Operation Fortitude. Clear reception by the Germans of messages transmitted by García, code name GARBO, were so crucial to the Allied deception that use of the relatively high-powered transmitter was deemed necessary.

Over 25,000 units were produced by Hallicrafters and other allied companies. In 1944, a short subject film was produced by the Jam Handy Organization and sponsored by the Hallicrafters Company detailing how the HT-4 transmitter was adapted for military service and dramatizing its use by the U.S. military during World War II.

Specifications 
 
 Frequency coverage: 2 to 18 MHz
 Mode: AM, CW
 RF power Output: <400 watts CW, <300 watts AM, MCW
 Vacuum tubes: Eimac 250TH final, pair 100TH modulator, various rectifier and low level tubes
 Operating frequency determined by plug-in tuning units and final coils (up to three at once) in addition to FT-171B crystals
 Signal Corps Radio sets: SCR-299, SCR-399, SCR-499, or GRC-38, AM requires BC-614 (or Hallicrafters HT-5) speech amplifier
 Weight: 390 lb (177 kg) (without BC-614)
 Manual: TM 11-280

The "A" through "I" models are the same basic unit with relatively minor component and cosmetic differences.

See also 
ARC-5
BC-348
BC-654
R-390A
SCR-299
Signal Corps Radio
Vintage amateur radio

References

External links 
 Hallicrafters, The Voice Of Victory (1944), Internet Archive, Part 1
 Hallicrafters, The Voice Of Victory (1944), Internet Archive, Part 2
 Restoration of BC-610 by amateur radio operators
 QST Old Radio column, Hallicrafters HT-4, to war and home again

Military radio systems of the United States
World War II American electronics
Military equipment introduced from 1940 to 1944